The Global Oneness Project is a free multimedia education platform providing stories and lessons for growing minds.

Content and coverage
Global Oneness Project offers documentary films, photography, essays, and curricula that explore social, cultural, and environmental issues.

Contributing filmmakers, photographers, and writers include Matt Black, Robert Hass, Kalyanee Mam, Parker Palmer, Camille Seaman, and Emmanuel Vaughan-Lee, among others. Films include stories from Australia, Cambodia, Ecuador, India, South Africa, and the United States, among others.

History
Founded in 2006 by Emmanuel Vaughan-Lee, the Global Oneness Project provides stories through documentary films, photo essays, and essays.

Films have been aired or released on The New York Times, TED, The Atlantic, Aeon Film, ABC Australia (Australian Broadcasting Corporation), Huffington Post, Current TV, Link TV PBS, among others.

Awards
In 2008, Global Oneness Project was an Honoree in the subject of Activism for the Webby Awards
In 2018, Global Oneness Project was awarded a "Best Website for Teaching and Learning" by the American Library Association. Common Sense Media, in 2018, selected Global Oneness Project as a top pick for learning with a four-star review, stating the Project provides "Captivating, cross-curricular stories [to] increase cultural awareness."

References

External links

Organizations established in 2006
2006 establishments in California
Non-profit organizations based in San Francisco